Wayne Llewellen Duvenage (born 3 January 1960 in Harare, Zimbabwe)
is a South African businessman, entrepreneur and civil activist.  He is currently the CEO of the South African corruption-fighting civil action organisation, Organisation Undoing Tax Abuse (OUTA), involved in fighting corruption and maladministration across all spheres of government in South Africa.

A BSc. Graduate of University of KwaZulu-Natal, Duvenage has 28 years experience in the travel and tourism industry.  During his corporate career, he was Chief Executive of Avis Car Rental South Africa, president of the South African Vehicle Rental and Leasing Association (SAVRALA) and has held positions on both the boards of Tourism Marketing SA (TOMSA) and Tourism Business Council SA (TBCSA).

Duvenage joined OUTA as CEO in 2012 when it was a single-issue organisation – Opposition to Urban Tolling Alliance – aimed at resisting government plans to introduce electronic urban toll collection in the Gauteng province.

He is co-author with Angelique Serrao of 'The E-Toll Saga: A Journey from CEO to Civil Activist'.

References 

South African anti-corruption activists
Living people
1960 births
South African whistleblowers
Chief executives in the automobile industry
Nonprofit chief executives
South African chief executives